JetStream and Mobile JetStream are two former brand names used by Spark New Zealand to market its retail and resale ADSL-based fixed line and CDMA2000-based 3G wireless Internet access offerings respectively. The retail ADSL offering from its own Internet service provider, Xtra, was commonly referred to by the company as Xtra Broadband. "Jetstream" is no longer used, and has been replaced with "Ultra" for their Broadband and Mobile offerings. Xtra branding was retired in 2008.

Retail ADSL offerings (using Telecom's network) from non-Telecom ISPs such as Vodafone and Slingshot (ISP) were often sold under the resale option. The Jetstream partnering program was retired in August 2005. Resellers were then  migrated to retail plans that either use Telecom's wholesaled WBS or UBS ADSL offerings.

VDSL and Fibre broadband are becoming more popular options in 2014.

References

External links
 Telecom WBS page
 Telecom Wholesale's UBS home page

Internet in New Zealand